Presidential elections were held in Cameroon on 5 April 1975. The country was a one-party state at the time, with the Cameroonian National Union as the sole legal party. Its leader, Ahmadou Ahidjo, was the only candidate in the election, and won unopposed.

Results

References

Cameroon
1975 in Cameroon
Presidential elections in Cameroon
One-party elections
Single-candidate elections
April 1975 events in Africa